Paul Henry Winspear Ivey (born 1 April 1961) is an English former professional footballer who played in the Football League for Birmingham City and Chesterfield. He also played briefly for Kettering Town, and in Sweden for Karlskrona AIF, Kalmar AIKwhere he made a name for himself by scoring the winner in the 1983 local derby against their "bigger" neighbours Kalmar FFand Vasalunds IF. He was born in Westminster and played as a forward.

References

1961 births
Living people
Footballers from Westminster
English footballers
Association football forwards
Birmingham City F.C. players
Kettering Town F.C. players
Chesterfield F.C. players
FK Karlskrona players
Vasalunds IF players
English Football League players
Expatriate footballers in Sweden